Collier Row is an area of Romford in East London, England, within the London Borough of Havering.

The area is based on a large housing estate built during the 1930s as part of the inter-war London housing expansion, with shopping facilities around a central crossroads. Its name originates from charcoal burners who used to occupy the area.

Remains of a Roman settlement have been uncovered in the area.

Transport and locale
The area is not connected to the London Underground or National Rail networks; however, Hainault and Newbury Park Underground stations (Central line) and Romford railway station are nearby. Transport for London bus routes 175, 247, 252, 294, 365 and 375 and commercial route 575 from Epping to Romford and Lakeside serve the local area, and it is planned that a future extension of the East London Transit could serve the area.

The A12 (Eastern Avenue), which runs through Collier Row at its southern end, leads to London and the east coast of Essex, and crosses the M25 on its eastern section.

Nearest places
Hainault
Marks Gate
Rise Park
Havering-atte-Bower
Romford
Chigwell Row

Education

Situated on Havering Road, Parklands School (both primary and junior) opened in 1929-1931. In 1995 the school was given "Beacon Status" due to the high standards of education provided. It is one of the largest primary schools in the area.  The school has a quad area which is home to many animals; in the past the quad has been home to lambs, goats, chickens, guinea pigs, and rabbits.

References
https://www.havering.gov.uk/Pages/ServiceChild/Collier-Row-town-centre-history.aspx

Areas of London
Districts of the London Borough of Havering
Romford
District centres of London